Thomas Grimstead (26 March 1803 – 24 January 1884) was an English cricketer with possibly amateur status who was active in 1831. He was born in Leatherhead, Surrey and died in Redbourn, Hertfordshire. He made his first-class debut in 1831 and appeared in one match as an unknown handedness batsman whose bowling style is unknown, playing for Surrey. He scored nine runs with a highest score of 6 and took no wickets.

References

1803 births
1884 deaths
English cricketers
English cricketers of 1826 to 1863
Surrey cricketers
People from Leatherhead